Niko Nicotera is a German-born American actor best known for playing George "Ratboy" Skogstrom in the television series Sons of Anarchy (2011–2014).

Early life and education
Niko was born in Giessen, Germany, on an American military base, and traveled with his family to Italy and London after leaving Germany. While in London he studied classical theater at The Academy of Live and Recorded Arts.

Career
He has done work on both British and American television.

Personal life
He currently lives in Los Angeles, California.

Filmography

Film

Television

References

External links

 

20th-century American male actors
21st-century American male actors
Living people
American male television actors
American expatriates in England
Sons of Anarchy
American male film actors
Alumni of the Academy of Live and Recorded Arts
Year of birth missing (living people)